Thomas Wood may refer to:

Politicians
 Thomas Wood (1708–1799), British MP for Middlesex
 Thomas Wood (1777–1860), British MP for Breconshire
 Thomas Wood (British Army officer) (1804–1872), British MP for Middlesex
 Thomas Wood (1815–98) (1815–1898), Canadian politician
 Thomas Wood (mayor) (1792–1861), mayor of Columbus, Ohio
 Thomas Wood (soldier) (1853–1933), British soldier and Conservative MP for Breconshire 1892–1900
 Thomas Harold Wood (1889–1965), Canadian politician
 Thomas Jefferson Wood (1844–1908), U.S. Representative from Indiana
 Thomas McKinnon Wood (1855–1927), British Liberal politician

Religious figures
 Thomas Wood (bishop of Lichfield and Coventry) (1607–1692), Anglican diocesan bishop
 Thomas Wood (bishop of Bedford) (1885–1961), Anglican suffragan bishop
 Thomas Wood (priest), Roman Catholic chaplain to Queen Mary of England
 Thomas Wood (reverend) (1711–1778), minister in Halifax, Nova Scotia, Canada

Sportspeople
 Thomas Wood (Somerset cricketer) (1861–1933), English cricketer
 Tom Wood (Derbyshire cricketer) (born 1994), English cricketer
 Leslie Wood (footballer) (Thomas Leslie Wooborn, 1932–2005), English footballer

Artists
 Thomas Peploe Wood (1817–1845), English artist
 Thomas Waterman Wood (1823–1903), American painter

Others
 Thomas Wood (composer) (1892–1950), English composer and author
 E. Thomas Wood (born 1963), American journalist and author
 Thomas J. Wood (1823–1906), Union General during the American Civil War
 Thomas Barlow Wood (1869–1929), British professor of agriculture, founder of the Journal of Agricultural Science
 Thomas Mills Wood (born 1963), American film and television character actor, aka Tom Wood

See also
 Tom Wood (disambiguation)
 Thomas Woods (disambiguation)
 Thomas Wode (died 1502), British judge
 Thomas Wode (MP)